The Castle of Trebujena (Spanish: Castillo de Trebujena) is a castle located in Trebujena, Spain. It was declared Bien de Interés Cultural in 1993.

References 

Bien de Interés Cultural landmarks in the Province of Cádiz
Castles in Andalusia